Springdale Aerodrome  is a registered aerodrome located  west of Springdale, Newfoundland and Labrador, Canada.

See also
Springdale/Davis Pond Water Aerodrome

References

Registered aerodromes in Newfoundland and Labrador